Old Southport High School, also known as the Old Southport Middle School, is a historic high school building located at Indianapolis, Marion County, Indiana.  It was built in 1930, and is a two-story, "U"-shaped, Colonial Revival style steel frame and concrete building sheathed in red brick with limestone detailing. It has a side gabled roof topped by an octagonal cupola.  The front facade features a grand portico supported by six Corinthian order columns.

It was added to the National Register of Historic Places in 2003.

References

High schools in Indiana
School buildings on the National Register of Historic Places in Indiana
Colonial Revival architecture in Indiana
School buildings completed in 1930
Schools in Indianapolis
National Register of Historic Places in Indianapolis
1930 establishments in Indiana